"911 Is a Joke" is a 1990 song by American hip hop group Public Enemy, from their third album, Fear of a Black Planet. The song is solely performed by Flavor Flav. It was released as a single and became a hit in April 1990, reaching number 15 on the Hot R&B/Hip-Hop Singles & Tracks chart, and number one on the Hot Rap Singles chart, becoming their second number-one rap chart hit after "Fight the Power". It also reached number one on the Bubbling Under Hot 100 Singles chart. This was due largely to its sales, which were unusually high for the level of mainstream airplay it received; Billboard reported that only one of the stations on its Top 40 panel was playing it.

The song is about the lack of response to emergency calls in a black neighborhood, but specifically references the poor response by paramedic crews and not the police, which is a common misconception regarding the track;
the "911" in the title of the song refers to 9-1-1, the emergency telephone number used in North America.

Production
The song was written by Public Enemy member Flavor Flav and producers Keith Shocklee and Eric "Vietnam" Sadler of The Bomb Squad, Public Enemy's production team.  Flavor Flav is the featured vocalist.

Music video
The official music video was directed by Charles Stone III. The clip is notable for having an appearance from a then-unknown Samuel L. Jackson.

Samples used
Among the samples used in "911 Is a Joke" is Vincent Price's laughter from "Thriller" by Michael Jackson. Other samples include "Flash Light" by Parliament, "Misunderstood" by Mico Wave, "Think (About It)" by Lyn Collins, "Gottago Gottago!" by Robin Harris, "Devil With the Bust" by Sound Experience, "Feel Like Dancing" by Wilbur "Bad" Bascomb, and "Hit by a Car" and "Singers" by Eddie Murphy. According to law professors Peter DiCola and Kembrew McLeod, if the samples used on "911 Is a Joke" and the other tracks on Fear of a Black Planet had been cleared for copyright under 2010 rates, each copy of the album would have generated a loss of five dollars per album sold, instead of a profit.

Charts

Covers and media references
San Francisco alternative metal band Faith No More covered a snippet of the song during several shows in 1990.

In October 1994, the song was featured prominently in the opening scene of "Tasha", an early episode of the Fox police drama television series New York Undercover.

In 1995, English pop rock band Duran Duran covered "911 Is a Joke" on their Thank You album.

In 2009, The Washington Post ran a story discussing Public Enemy members' visit to a center for homeless and displaced youth.
The article referred to the song "911 is a Joke", but due to a copy-editing error,
"911" was printed as "9/11", which some readers
took to be a reference to the September 11 attacks. A week later, the Post printed a correction.

On "Epidemiology," a 2010 episode of the NBC sitcom Community, Jeff (portrayed by Joel McHale) is unable to contact a 911 operator during an emergency—prompting him to declare that "Flavor Flav was right."

References

1990 singles
Public Enemy (band) songs
1989 songs
Def Jam Recordings singles
Political rap songs
Protest songs
Songs written by Flavor Flav
Songs written by Keith Shocklee
Songs written by Eric "Vietnam" Sadler